Noël Noël is a 22-minute animated short produced by the National Film Board of Canada in 2003 as a Christmas special. It was directed by Nicola Lemay and written by Martin Barry. The English-language version was adapted by John Weldon and narrated by Leslie Nielsen. The original French-language version was narrated by Benoît Brière.

Awards for the film included the Prix Gémeaux for Best Animated Program or Series and an Award of Excellence in the category of Animation age 6 - 8 from the Alliance for Children and Television.

In the United States, the short aired on Cartoon Network.

Plot
Billionaire businessman Noel Noël is rich but rude. He falls for a fairy named Beatrice, and tries to win her love with material gifts before learning the true meaning of love from a little girl named Zoey Murphy, her dog Snooze, and a blue-eyed reindeer.

See also
 List of Christmas films

References

External links
 
 Watch Noël Noël in English and French at NFB.ca

2003 animated films
2003 short films
2003 television films
2003 in Canadian television
2000s animated short films
2000s Christmas films
2003 films
2003 television specials
2000s animated television specials
Canadian television specials
Canadian animated short films
National Film Board of Canada animated short films
Canadian Christmas films
Quebec films
Christmas television specials
Prix Gémeaux-winning shows
Canadian children's animated films
Films about fairies and sprites
Television about fairies and sprites
French-language Canadian films
2000s Canadian films